O mar na Lajinha, also as No mar da Lajinha (Capeverdean Creole, ALUPEK: U mar na Lajinha, Nu mar da Lajinha) is a Capeverdean novel published in 2004 by Germano Almeida. The story is about a group of people meeting regularly for a swim at the Lajinha beach on the island of São Vicente.

One of the chapters are named "Women of Lajinha" ("Mulheres de Lajinha").

In 2006, this section of the novel would be adapted into a theatrical play which was performed at GTCCPPM in Mindelo, the area where the novel was set.  One of the performers was João Branco.

References

Further reading
O mar na Lajinha (2004)

External links
O mar na Lajinha on the African Review of Books
Germano Almeida - O mar na Lajinha
- 30k O mar na Lajinha at Editorial Caminho

Mar na Lajinha
Mar na Lajinha
Cape Verdean novels
Novels set in Cape Verde
Mar Lajinha